Jagoče is a settlement on the right bank of the Savinja River, north of Laško in eastern Slovenia. The area is part of the traditional region of Styria. It is now included with the rest of the Municipality of Laško in the Savinja Statistical Region.

References

External links
Jagoče on Geopedia

Populated places in the Municipality of Laško